Nawojka (14th-century – 15th-century) was a  medieval Polish woman known to have dressed as a boy in order to study at the University of Kraków in the 15th century. She later became a nun. She is considered to be the first female student and teacher in Poland.

Overview
The story of her was first told by the abbot Martin of Leibitz (d. 1464) in Vienna in about 1429. There are several different versions of the legend.

According to one version, she was a daughter of a teacher in a church school in Gniezno, schooled by her father, who decided to continue her studies using any means necessary. According to another version, she was a girl who inherited a fortune when orphaned. In yet another variant of the story ("[this] claim is as well documented as any other") she came from Dobrzyń nad Wisłą.
In any case, dressed as a boy, she enrolled at the University of Kraków in the name of Andrzej (or Jakub; two versions of the name she used are reported). At that time it was forbidden for women to attend universities.

Discovery
Nawojka successfully fooled everyone and studied for two years, making herself a name as a great scholar and a serious student. According to a possibly later addition to the story,
she was offered work as a domestic assistant to one of the professors, but declined: at the time servants were expected to accompany their masters to the public bath.

One day, she was exposed as a woman. The versions differ here again: according to one, two soldiers wagered that the student walking by was in fact a woman, and exposed her; according to the second, she was found by a son of wójt from Gniezno who joined the school; according to the third one, she fell ill and a doctor examining her found out the truth.

When she was brought before the authorities to explain why she had disguised her gender, she simply answered: "For the will of learning". When they interrogated her fellow-students and professors they could find no one to accuse her of immoral conduct. Her record as a student was excellent. She was not convicted of any crime, but the judges did not want to acquit her entirely. According to Martin of Leibitz, she asked to be taken to a convent. She took her vows there, became a teacher and a leader of the convent school, and eventually the abbess.

This story may or may not be true. Some historians say that if it is true, her time at the university was about 1407–1409.

Legacy
The Jagiellonian University did not allow women to study until 1897, and to hold academic positions until 1906. The university's first women's dormitory, opened in 1936, was named after Nawojka. One of the streets in Kraków is also named after her.

References

External links
Street map showing locations of Nawojka street and Nawojka dormitory in Cracow
 Polish Literature in English Translation: The Prayerbook of Nawojka

Female-to-male cross-dressers
14th-century births
15th-century deaths
Legendary Polish people
Jagiellonian University alumni
15th-century Polish nuns
14th-century Polish people
14th-century Polish women